Ab und Zu (established 1987) is a Norwegian jazz band, originally named "Anne Marie Giørtz Quintet" (1982–1987), and presenting music written by Ole Henrik Giørtz.

Biography 
The quintet comprised the siblings Anne-Marie Giørtz (vocals) and Ole Henrik Giørtz (piano), together with Vidar Johansen (saxophone), Audun Kleive (drums) and Olaf Kamfjord (bass). The first record release was Breaking out (1983), followed by Tigers of pain (1985), where drummer Audun Kleive was substituted for Finn Sletten. Tigers of pain was the first album where they present lyrics by Fran Landesman.

The band changed name in 1987, and released the album Ab und Zu (1989) with two substitutes in the band, drummer Paolo Vinaccia
and guitarist Eivind Aarset. At Moldejazz they performed the commissions Den akustiske skyggen (1993) and Skrapjern og silke (1999), both presenting lyrics by Lars Saabye Christensen. When they released the next album Totally (1996) the drummer Kim Ofstad was in the line-up. The last album release was Spark of life (2002).

With the big band Prime Time Orchestra they performed the commissioned work Rhymes at midnight at «Sandvika Storbandfestival» (2004), this time also presenting lyrics by Fran Landesman. The lineup on this project is with Kenneth Ekornes (drums) and Tore Brunborg (saxophone).

Band members 
Anne–Marie Giørtz – vocal
Ole Henrik Giørtz – piano
Vidar Johansen – saxophone
Tore Brunborg – saxophone
Olaf Kamfjord – bass
Kenneth Ekornes – drums

Former members
Anne Marie Giørtz Quintet 
Audun Kleive – drums
Finn Sletten – drums

Former members
Ab und Zu
Eivind Aarset – guitar
Paolo Vinaccia – drums
Kim Ofstad – drums

Discography 
As Anne Marie Giørtz Quintet
1983: Breaking out (Hot Club)
1985: Tigers of pain (Odin)

As Ab und Zu
1989: Ab und Zu (Curling Legs)
1996: Totally (Curling Legs)
1999: Skrapjern og silke (Grappa)
2002: Spark of life (Curling Legs)

References

External links
Ab und Zu at Curling Legs

1987 establishments in Norway
Curling Legs artists
Grappa Music artists
Hot Club Records artists
Musical groups established in 1987
Musical groups from Oslo
Norwegian jazz ensembles
Odin Records artists